The Green Connection is an aquarium and science discovery center in Kota Kinabalu, Sabah, Malaysia. The Green Connection opened in May 2010 and is located just outside downtown Kota Kinabalu in the Northwest corner of the island of Borneo.

History
In 2005, the location where the aquarium now stands was a vacant swamp. Prof. Steve Oakley, a marine biologist, working  at the University Malaysia Sarawak's (Unimas) Institute of Biodiversity and Environmental Conservation, and the scientists working with him, were studying and working on rejuvenating coral reefs and rescuing marine life. They partnered with the Sabah Foundation (YS), which had similar goals of educating the public. It is now the major shareholder in Aquatica Aquarium and Discovery Centre Sdn Bhd, which owns the Green Connection.

By 2010 about  had been developed, and the aquarium was opened to the public.

Exhibits

The Green Connection showcases Borneo's biodiversity with displays featuring over 1200 species of wildlife from seven ecosystems and interactive exhibits incorporating many aspects of aquatic science. It has  of recirculating water and exhibits 12,500 plants and animals representing 670 species. Another display showcases one of the world's most deadly snakes, the banded sea krait Laticauda Colubrina.

The Green Connection is arranged as an introduction to the ecosystem of Sabah. Visitors walk through limestone caves, dense jungle, muddy mangroves, reefs, and out into the open ocean where coral reefs grow.

Education
The discovery section of the aquarium is an interactive experience where the exhibits bring the world of water and ocean science to life. School visits follow the Malaysian Curriculum and usually focus on environmental education and conservation issues.

When visitors first arrive at Sabah, the aquarium introduces the wildlife they will see throughout their visit. Once they have visited the reefs of Sipadan and Layang Layang, or the forests of Sabah, visitors can return to the aquarium to see species they missed while exploring in the wild.

Sustainability and conservation

The Green Connection aims to promote marine conservation and environmental awareness. It has many snakes bred in captivity from wild-caught parents purchased from hunters. The wild-caught snakes are frequently damaged and require care and treatment for injuries. After treatment for males or after egg laying for females, the wild snakes are released back to the national parks of Sabah. All the snakes on public display were raised from eggs and handled daily. The snakes are used in rotation to not get excessive handling from visitors. 
The center also has a turtle rescue center where sick, injured, or juvenile turtles can be cared for before being released back into the wild.

All the fish are purchased from fishers in an attempt to stop them from getting eaten. The giant coral reef tank has 17 tons of artificial rock, 35 tons of sand, and contains  of water. The corals for the aquarium were planted between 2005 and 2007 on several nursery sites on the degraded reef. The coral nubbins came from coral fragments recovered from bomb fishing blast sites. A total of 6500 coral blocks were planted and more than 10,000 faux rock blocks: some were overturned by fish, and the corals smothered, and some grew so fast that they have become part of the reef at the nursery site, some have been moved to the Green Connection, and the nursery corals have been thinned, and moved apart with the excess corals replanted back on degraded reefs.  The project has expanded and anyone can plant corals to help reefs recover.

In keeping with its conservation focus, The Green Connection was designed to be off-grid except for its drinking water. All gray water is recycled after being filtered through on-site reed beds.

Notes

References
Fun with snakes and games at Aquatica exhibition (Borneo Bost 8 February 2010)
Green Connection celebrate World Environment Day

External links 
 
 

Aquaria in Malaysia
Buildings and structures in Kota Kinabalu
Tourist attractions in Sabah